The 2002 Canadian Grand Prix was the eighth round of the 2002 Formula One season and was held on 9 June 2002 at the Circuit Gilles Villeneuve. Michael Schumacher won his sixth Grand Prix of the season and his fifth Canadian Grand Prix win. Schumacher fended off the challenges of Juan Pablo Montoya, who later retired, and his teammate Rubens Barrichello, whose race strategy cost him a chance of victory and demoting him to third. Fresh off his victory at Monaco, David Coulthard finished second in the race and earned his fourth podium finish of the season.

Background
The Canadian Grand Prix is the first race of the season were the cars run in a low downforce configuration. The previous Canadian Grand Prix, Ralf Schumacher in the Williams won comfortably from Michael Schumacher thanks to the power of the BMW engine. However this time, it is believed that Ferrari have closed the gap considerably in terms of engine power and therefore expect a showdown between the 2 teams with tyres playing a major role in the outcome of the race.
Behind those two teams, no one will come close but expect a fight between Sauber, Renault, McLaren and possibly the Honda runners.

The previous week before the race, all the Formula 1 teams were testing. With the exception of Minardi, all the teams were testing at Silverstone but due to changing weather conditions, it was hard to read anything into the times. Ferrari were also testing at Monza while BAR had a private session at Circuit Paul Ricard to test the new components to be used here and that includes a new engine, gearbox and aero package. Minardi also conducted a 2-day test at Vairano.

Qualifying
Juan Pablo Montoya in the Williams secured his third pole position of the season and the sixth of his career after seeing off a close challenge from world championship leader, Michael Schumacher. Montoya posted a 1m 12.836s to beat his arch-rival Schumacher by just 0.182s.

Montoya was the only driver to break the 1m 13s barrier and he did it twice. Schumacher`s chances of retaliating at the end of the session were spoiled by a few spots of rain that affected one or two parts of the track. Montoya quoted, "The car has been very competitive so far, and the tyres play a very important role. It is going to be an interesting race tomorrow where strategy and tyres will be important factors."

Michael Schumacher`s teammate Rubens Barrichello lined up third, despite an accident during Saturday morning final free practice session and a spin towards the end of qualifying. He starts just ahead of Michelin drivers Ralf Schumacher and Kimi Räikkönen. Ralf Schumacher, the winner of the previous Canadian Grand Prix had a technical problem, meant that he had to switch to the T-car which was set for Montoya. Ralf quoted, "The T-car was set up for Juan but I have managed to take the best out of it anyway. I am confident for the race, also because I am sure that Michelin are competitive here."
 
David Coulthard in the McLaren and Jarno Trulli in the Renault were the other Michelin drivers to crack the top 10. It was a dramatic session for Trulli, who was hindered when he smashed his race chassis into one of the circuit`s concrete retaining walls and had to return the crippled car to the pit lane before switching to his team`s spare chassis for his final run.
 
Jenson Button in the Renault led the remaining Michelin runners, ahead of Eddie Irvine, Pedro de la Rosa, Mika Salo, Allan McNish, Mark Webber and Alex Yoong. De la Rosa had to abort one run because of a spin. Yoong failed to complete the last of four qualifying laps because a technical problem forced him to pull off the track.
 
Local favourite Jacques Villeneuve in the BAR started ninth, his best grid position of the season. Italian Giancarlo Fisichella gave the Jordan team heart by posting his first top-six qualifying performance of the season, but his teammate Takuma Sato's session was ruined by a spectacular engine failure.

Qualifying classification

Race
Montoya got the jump at the start, to lead into the first hairpin, with Barrichello slotting in ahead of Michael Schumacher for second. Räikkönen moved up to fourth ahead of Ralf Schumacher, while a good start elevated Coulthard ahead of  Nick Heidfeld and  Giancarlo Fisichella. Montoya's lead only lasted for the opening lap, however, as the Colombian ran wide at the final chicane, allowing Barrichello the run into the first corner, and the race lead. The Ferrari driver began to gradually extend his lead, but with the Brazilian on a two-stop strategy, he would need to make up a comfortable margin to be able to retain it after the stops. However, his strategy went up in smoke on lap fifteen, when the Safety Car was deployed for Villeneuve's stranded BAR, whose engine had failed.

Montoya used this break to make his first stop, emerging in fifth place, while Barrichello stayed out in the lead. However, fate seemed to be smiling on the Colombian, as he quickly passed Räikkönen and Ralf Schumacher after the two delayed each other at the final chicane. Barrichello made his first stop on lap 26 dropping down the field as Michael Schumacher inherited the lead until his stop 12 laps later. This allowed Montoya back into the lead for a second time, but Schumacher resumed just 3.6 seconds behind, with the Williams driver still needing to make another stop. That he did fourteen laps later, but he had been unable to exploit his lighter car and rejoined nearly nine seconds behind the championship leader. However, Montoya had no chance of a straight race with the German, as the problematic BMW powerplant forced the Williams driver to make an early exit. Both Saubers and Toyota's Mika Salo received a drive-through penalty for speeding in the pitlane while Minardi's Alex Yoong received a 10-second stop-go penalty for the same reason.

With Montoya out, Schumacher was able to take it easy, while his teammate set about Coulthard for second position, after the Scot had passed both Barrichello and  Räikkönen during the pit stops. However, the Brazilian was unable to find a way past, and had to settle for the third spot on the podium, with Räikkönen taking fourth position 30 seconds behind. Fisichella took his third consecutive fifth-place finish, with Trulli claiming the final point. Williams' miserable day was completed when Ralf Schumacher's fuel hose failed during his pit stop, necessitating another a visit to the pits, which would drop him to seventh. Having failed to finish any of the previous eight Grand Prix, Olivier Panis took a morale boosting eighth position, ahead of Felipe Massa's Sauber. Takuma Sato made up for his Monaco crash with a conservative tenth-place finish, ahead of Mark Webber and Nick Heidfeld, who was forced to take two drive-through penalties after his speed-limiter failed. Heinz-Harald Frentzen and Alex Yoong completed the finishers.

Frentzen's teammate Enrique Bernoldi was an early casualty after a persistent vibration, while Pedro De La Rosa's Jaguar survived an early skirmish with McNish, but later retired as a result of gearbox dramas. The second Jaguar of Irvine only lasted twelve laps longer before its engine blew, while neither Toyota made the finish either; Mika Salo succumbed to brake problems, while McNish spun off. Britain's Jenson Button was the final retirement of the race with an engine failure five laps from the end.

Canada had been seen as one of Williams' best chances to close on Ferrari, but as the Italian team took fourteen points, they left empty-handed. This was Ferrari's 150th Formula 1 victory.

Race classification

Championship standings after the race 

Drivers' Championship standings

Constructors' Championship standings

Note: Only the top five positions are included for both sets of standings.

References

External links

Canadian Grand Prix
Canadian Grand Prix
Grand Prix
2000s in Montreal
2002 in Quebec
Grand Prix